Shcherbakovka is a rural locality (a selo) in Vodnobuyerachnoye Rural Settlement, Kamyshinsky District, Volgograd Oblast, Russia. The population was 182 as of 2010. There are 5 streets.

Geography 
Shcherbakovka is located on the Volga Upland, on the west bank of the Volgograd Reservoir, 63 km northeast of Kamyshin (the district's administrative centre) by road. Shcherbatovka is the nearest rural locality.

References 

Rural localities in Kamyshinsky District